Ignacio Mieres (born April 6, 1987, in Buenos Aires) is an Argentine rugby union player. He previously played for Worcester Warriors in the RFU Championship

Mieres was signed on trials for Leicester Tigers in March 2008. After only being able to play sevens for the Tigers, Loffreda got sacked from Leicester and Mieres decided to move forward. It was then when he decided to move to Stade Francais, where he wasn't able to play because of his Argentinean passport, and Stade Francais already having two foreign players, Roncero and Gasnier.

Mieres joined Perpignan as back-up for Dan Carter and spent 4 months there. The next season, he returned to Stade Francais, where he played 10 matches in the Top 14 and Heineken Cup. When the season finished, Mieres was released and went back to Argentina, where he played for the Pampas for a couple of months before moving to Exeter Chiefs.
He started his career at Exeter as the third choice fly-half, and after waiting a couple of months, he started the last two games of the Premiership scoring 25 points.
For 2011/2012 Mieres was picked as the first-choice number 10 for the Chiefs scoring over 270 points across Premiership and Amlin Challenge Cup matches. After having an outstanding season, qualifying for Heineken Cup and being picked as the player of the season, he signed a two-year contract with Exeter, and is waiting for his chance in the  "Pumas" team.

It was announced on 6 February 2013 that at the conclusion of the season Mieres will be joining Worcester Warriors.

He kicks post, and is able to play at fly-half, centre or full back.

References

1987 births
Living people
Rugby union players from Buenos Aires
Argentine rugby union players
Argentina international rugby union players
Argentine expatriate sportspeople in France
Expatriate rugby union players in France
Rugby union fly-halves
Stade Français players
Exeter Chiefs players
US Dax players
Argentine expatriate rugby union players
Expatriate rugby union players in England
Argentine expatriate sportspeople in England